The Jewish community of the Greater Cleveland area comprises a significant ethnoreligious population of the U.S. State of Ohio. It began in 1839 by immigrants from Bavaria and its size has significantly grown in the decades since then. In the early 21st century, Ohio's census data reported over 150,000 Jews, with the Cleveland area being home to more than 50% of this population. As of 2018, Greater Cleveland is the 23rd largest Jewish community in the United States. As of 2022, the Cleveland Jewish Community is estimated to be about 100,000 people. 

In 2012, the Jewish Population in Greater Cleveland was estimated at 80,800. Over the next few years, Cleveland saw a rapid influx of Jews particularly within the city’s Orthodox Jewish and corporate business communities. Cleveland’s sudden emergence as a business city in the 2010’s prompted thousands of young Jewish professionals to move all over the city, including the west side to areas such as Lakewood and Tremont. Cleveland’s Orthodox community saw rapid growth based on an influx of Jews fleeing worsening conditions and rising antisemitism in New York and New Jersey, as well as from Europe.

History 
In 1839, the first Jewish immigrants came to Cleveland from Bavaria. The first Jewish immigrant was a man named Simson Thorman. Within 25 years, the population of Jews grew to 1,200.

From the late 1800s and well into the 1950s, the vast majority of Jews lived in the inner city neighborhoods of Glenville, Kinsman, and Hough. In 1920, the Jewish population grew up to 90,000.

By the 1940s, many Jews lived in Glenville, Kinsman, Hough, and the then newly built Shaker Heights and Cleveland Heights neighborhoods. There were dozens of synagogues spread throughout these neighborhoods, which were diverse in terms of wealth based class of Cleveland Jews. Glenville, Kinsman, and Hough were older neighborhoods in the inner city with densely built tenement houses, while the Heights was considered a wealthier neighborhood, given the mansions that had been built there throughout the early 1900s. E.105th Street in Cleveland was often referred to as "Yiddishe Downtown", or "Jewish Downtown", as the busy street was filled with high rise buildings which held hundreds of Jewish owned businesses.

By the 1950s and 1960s, the Jewish Community rapidly started to move further into the then newly developed suburbs of Cleveland Heights, University Heights, Shaker Heights, South Euclid, and Beachwood. This left the once historically Jewish Glenville neighborhood into a majorly African American neighborhood.

By the 1980s, there were more than 150 Jewish organizations in the Greater Cleveland area.

As of 2022, there are about 100,000 Jewish Clevelanders who mostly live in the eastern suburbs of Beachwood, Solon, Moreland Hills, Pepper Pike, South Euclid, Lyndhurst, Shaker Heights, Cleveland Heights, University Heights and Orange. Many young Jewish business professionals live downtown and on the west side in neighbors such as Lakewood and Tremont.

Diaspora of Jews throughout Cleveland 

Like many other cities in the United States, Cleveland has seen several demographic shifts persist among various neighborhoods since the beginning of its foundation. Cleveland's Jewish community tended to follow the movement of other families in the inner city, pursuing better living conditions and moving jobs that weren't available in the densely populated inner city. As the Jews left for the suburbs, African Americans going through the Great Migration moved in. This often turned once predominantly Jewish inner city neighborhoods such as Glenville into African-American neighborhoods by the 1950s. Given that Jewish communities tend to maintain close, dense ties within them, Cleveland's Jewish demographic shift is seen through the movement of Jews through different neighborhoods over the decades.

Cleveland's first Jews settled in downtown Cleveland in 1839, with Cleveland's first few dozen Jewish families establishing the Cleveland Israelitic Society. This was the city's first synagogue, located on Eagle Street, now the site of Progressive Field. Over time, as Cleveland's Jewish population grew parallel to the city of Cleveland's growth and development into a major city, the Jewish community shifted east into what were then newly developed neighborhoods. By the mid-late 1800s, the majority of Cleveland's Jews lived in the Hough neighborhood of Cleveland. Several large and historic synagogues were built throughout the neighborhood, many of which are still standing as historic landmarks today, now being used as African-American churches.

By 1926, the majority of Cleveland's Jews had moved out of the Hough and Woodland neighborhoods for the further east Kinsman and Glenville neighborhoods. Glenville became a dense center of Jewish life in Cleveland, with the Jewish demographics of the neighborhood reaching above 90% in the 1930s. E.105th Street in Glenville is noted as once being a thriving Avenue of Jewish life, with dozens of Jewish grocery stores, shops, businesses, and synagogues once lining along the street. After World War II, the Jewish community started to follow other families in the inner city into the then newly developed neighborhoods in Cleveland Heights, Shaker Heights, and University Heights, often referred to as simply "Heights" by the Cleveland Jewish community.

In 1948, a heated village-wide debate was sparked in Beachwood after a proposal for the construction of the Anshe Chesed Fairmount Temple was presented to the village council, making it the first synagogue within the village limits of the then mostly non-Jewish neighborhood. Antisemitism persisted throughout the village for decades, and only increased with the proposal of the synagogue. The argument eventually turned into an Ohio Supreme Court case, which ruled that the synagogue must be allowed to be built on its current site in Beachwood. The large synagogue prompted congregants, mainly hundreds of Jewish families, to move to Beachwood. Hundreds of more Jewish families continued to move to Beachwood throughout the 1950s, with the rapid population growth prompting Beachwood to be established as a city in 1960. With Cleveland's 100,000 Jews now living in the east side suburbs, the beginning of a halt in rapid movement started, creating the current demographics of a Jewish community seen today in Cleveland. By the mid 1970s as the Jewish community grew, Jews started to move into the newly developed neighborhoods of Orange and Pepper Pike, and continued to move southeast into Solon by the 1990s. The eastern suburbs of Cleveland continue to hold a thriving Jewish community today.

Beachwood in particular is regarded by locals as being the center of Jewish life in Cleveland, given that the city has over a dozen Jewish institutions including several synagogues of all denominations, the Mandel Jewish Community Center, the Jewish Federation of Cleveland, the Cleveland Jewish News headquarters, Menorah Park, The Maltz Museum of Jewish Heritage, as well as dozens of Jewish owned businesses and organizations. The city of Beachwood is known as being “one of the most Jewish neighborhoods outside of Israel”, with a per capita Jewish population being one of the highest in the United States.

Education
There are five Jewish Day Schools in Greater Cleveland: The Joseph and Florence Mandel Jewish Day School, Gross Schechter Day School, Fuchs Mizrachi School, Yeshiva Derech Hatorah, and the Hebrew Academy of Cleveland. Approximately 10,000 students attend these schools. While Mandel JDS and Schechter educate up to 8th Grade, the Orthodox Schools educate through High School.

The Mandel family is known for large donations to Jewish organizations throughout the community, especially relating to education. The philanthropic family has given millions to places like Mandel JDS, the local JCC, Cuyahoga Community College, and Case Western Reserve University.

Akiva High School of Cleveland is a school that offers programs and classes for Jewish high schoolers in a variety of fields, including Hebrew classes, Israel advocacy, and other Jewish studies.

Beachwood High School, a school with one of the highest percentage of Jewish students, offers Hebrew as a foreign language class. Most public and private East Side suburban schools with significant numbers of Jewish students have a Jewish Student Union Club.

The Telshe Yeshiva, a rabbinical college relocated from Lithuania to the Greater Cleveland area in 1941 during the Holocaust, has a main campus in Wickliffe.

Jewish youth in Greater Cleveland

There are several Jewish youth group chapters in Greater Cleveland, including BBYO, USY, NCSY, and NFTY.

Greater Cleveland is home to the BBYO Region, Ohio Northern Region #23. ONR BBYO has been a staple of Jewish teens in the area since the 1930s, and since then has grown to the size it is today. ONR has approximately 600 members, with which they hold several annual conventions with the entire region. The Ohio Northern Region, based in Cleveland but also branched in Akron/Canton, Toledo, and Youngstown, have 17 different AZA and BBG Chapters. There are 8 ONR Chapters in Greater Cleveland.

Camp Wise is a Jewish summer camp located east of Cleveland in Chardon. Since 1907, Camp Wise has been the summer home to hundreds of Jewish kids and teens from grades 2-10 every year. Though the camp serves mostly campers from Cleveland, campers as well as counselors from around the world attend. Approximately 370 campers attend each session.

Most synagogues in Cleveland offer a wide variety of programs for Jewish kids and teens.

Akiva Cleveland is a school in Beachwood that teaches Jewish teens with Hebrew lessons, learning about Israel, and other Jewish studies.

Jewish Institutions in Greater Cleveland 

There are many Jewish Institutions in the Greater Cleveland Jewish Community:

The Jewish Federation of Cleveland is headquartered in Beachwood.

The Maltz Museum of Jewish Heritage is in Beachwood.

The Cleveland Jewish News is the local Jewish newspaper headquartered in Beachwood.

The Mandel Jewish Community Center, located in Beachwood, is a center point of the Jewish community.

The Workmen's Circle of Cleveland is a Jewish lodge group.

The Friendship Circle Organization for children with special needs has a center in Pepper Pike.

Menorah Park is a Jewish nursing home complex in Beachwood.

The Cleveland Hillel is located on the Case Western Reserve University campus.

Synagogues in Greater Cleveland 
There are dozens of synagogues of several denominations in Greater Cleveland. There are multiple Orthodox, Reform, Reconstructionist, and Conservative synagogues.

All synagogues may not be listed. Unregistered Shtiebel synagogues exist in some homes, with congregations as small as only a few families.

 Agudath B'nai Israel, Lorain; Conservative
 Ahavas Yisroel, Cleveland Heights; Orthodox
 Aish Hatorah, University Heights; Orthodox
 Anshe Chesed Fairmount Temple, Beachwood; Reform
 Beachwood Kehilla, Beachwood; Orthodox
 Beth El- The Heights Synagogue, Cleveland Heights
 Beth Israel- Westside Temple, West Park, Cleveland proper; Reform
 B'nai Jeshurun, Pepper Pike; Conservative
 Chabad of Cleveland Heights, Cleveland Heights; Orthodox
 Chabad at Case Western Reserve University, University Circle, Cleveland proper; multi-denominational
 Chabad of Downtown Cleveland, Downtown Cleveland, Cleveland proper; multi-denominational
 Chabad House of Cleveland, University Heights; Orthodox
 Chabad of Mayfield, Mayfield Heights; multi-denominational
 Chabad of Solon, Solon; Orthodox
 Chabad of the West Side, Westlake; multi-denominational
 Chabad of Twinsburg, Twinsburg, multi-denominational
 Congregation Zichron Chaim, University Heights; Orthodox
 Congregation K'hal Yereim, Cleveland Heights; Orthodox
 Congregation Shaarey Tikvah, Beachwood; Conservative 
 Congregation Shomre Shabbas, University Heights; Orthodox
 Fromovitz Chabad Center, Beachwood; Orthodox
 Green Road Synagogue, Beachwood; Orthodox
 Heights Jewish Center Synagogue, University Heights; Orthodox
 Jewish Secular Community of Cleveland, Solon; 
 Kol Ha'lev, Pepper Pike;  Reconstructionist
 Lubavitcher Rav of NE Ohio; Beachwood
 Oheb Zedek-Cedar Sinai Synagogue, Lyndhurst; Orthodox
 Oheb Zedek-Taylor Road Synagogue, Cleveland Heights; Orthodox
 Semach Sedek, South Euclid; Orthodox
 Suburban Temple Kol Ami, Beachwood; Reform
 Temple B'nai Abraham, Elyria; Reform
 Temple Emanu-El, Orange; Reform
 Temple Israel Ner Tamid, Mayfield Heights; Reform/Conservative
 Temple Tifereth Israel, Beachwood and University Circle; Reform
 The Park Synagogue, Cleveland Heights; Conservative
 Park Synagogue East, Pepper Pike; Conservative
 Semach Sedek RIAS Synagogue, South Euclid; Orthodox
 Torah U'tefila, Cleveland Heights; Orthodox
 Waxman Chabad Center, Beachwood; Orthodox
 Yeshivath Adath B'nai Israel, University Heights; Orthodox
 Young Israel of Greater Cleveland, Beachwood; Orthodox
 Zemach Zedek, Cleveland Heights; Orthodox

Jewish cemeteries 

There are 16 Jewish cemeteries and 3 Jewish sections of cemeteries in Cleveland. As of 2018, there are over 68,000 Jewish graves in the Cleveland area.

 Agudath Achim
 Baxter Cemetery
 Beachwood Cemetery (Oer Chodesh Section)
 Berger Cemetery
 Bet Olam Cemetery
 Chesed Shel Emeth Cemetery
 Chesterland Memorial Park
 Fir Street Cemetery
 Glenville Cemetery
 Harvard Cemetery
 Hillcrest Memorial Park Cemetery (Section)
 Lansing Cemetery
 Mayfield Cemetery
 Mt. Olive Cemetery
Mt. Sinai Cemetery
Ridge Road Cemetery
Western Reserve Memorial Gardens
Willet Street Cemetery
Zion Memorial Cemetery

Soviet-Jewish community

Greater Cleveland is home to one of the largest Soviet-Jewish populations in the U.S., after New York City. It is estimated that 10,000–15,000 Jews from the former Soviet Union reside in Greater Cleveland, most of whom live in Mayfield Heights, Solon, Beachwood, and Orange. Almost all Soviet immigrants to the U.S. (1970's-early 2000's) are Jewish. Cleveland is also home to Jewish owned Russian grocery stores, the largest being Yeleseyevsky Deli, as well as hundreds of Soviet-Jewish owned and Russian speaking businesses such as restaurants, retail stores, jewelers, pharmacies, and private warehouses.

In 1963, The Cleveland Council on Soviet Antisemitism was one of the first councils in the U.S. that brought the attention of the lives of Jews living in the Soviet Union, a time in which pogroms were common, Jews were discriminatorily marked on their documentation, and Jewish citizens of the USSR were commonly arrested for false or over-exaggerated crimes (See Soviet Jewry Movement). The council's biggest attempt was not only to inform about antisemitism, but also to bring in as many Jewish refugees from the USSR as possible. From the 1960s throughout the 1980s, immigration was slow. But, with Mikhail Gorbachev's allowance of Jewish emigration in 1989, the Cleveland Jewish Community immediately resettled hundreds of Soviet-Jews in the Greater Cleveland area, most of whom moved into apartments in Mayfield Heights, East Cleveland, South Euclid and Cleveland Heights. Within a few years, the number of Soviet-Jewish refugees in Cleveland had risen to a few thousand, and by the early 2000’s had reached about 15,000. The majority of Cleveland’s Soviet Jews arrived from Russia, Ukraine, Belarus, Moldova, and Uzbekistan. 

Though Soviet-Jews typically started off poor in the U.S., many rapidly grew into the upper middle class within a matter of a few years. This particularly unusual case of immigrants becoming so rapidly successful is contributed to a mix of progressive Soviet education and former employment concentrated around the fields of science, engineering, doctoring, and literature, as well as with the help of the Cleveland Jewish Community with essentials such as childcare, employment finding, English classes at Cuyahoga Community College, and financial assistance with rent and housing.

Because the majority of Soviet-Jewish immigrants in the 1980s–2000s were young couples, thousands of new Russian-Jewish families were started in Cleveland, and bilingual English-and Russian-speaking children are currently raised in the area.

The influx of Soviet-Jewish immigrants also brought a new wave of Yiddish speakers to Greater Cleveland, an almost reverse effect than that of Jewish communities in the rest of the U.S. Yiddish is the second dominant language of Soviet Jews after Russian, especially for Jews coming from shtetls and cities with large historic Jewish populations in Ukraine, Belarus, and Moldova. Most Soviet Jews born before 1960 have skills in speaking Yiddish.

Greater Cleveland is also home to three predominantly Jewish Russian newspapers, Russian Magazine and Prospect being two of them. The newspapers serve most Russians and Russian Jews in the area. Also, because of the extensive advertising for local Russian businesses, all newspapers are free and are issued to whoever orders a subscription. Russian Magazine celebrated its 20th year of production in 2013. Newspapers include sections of political news of the U.S., Russia, and other world news, anecdotes, and extensive advertisements for Russian speaking job openings, private practice Russian dentists and doctors, and Russian speaking restaurants, stores, and businesses in the Cleveland area.

Orthodox community
Greater Cleveland is home to an established Orthodox Jewish community. The area is home to an estimated 30,000 Orthodox Jews, including Hasidic Jews. There are fifteen Orthodox synagogues serving the Greater Cleveland community and three Jewish schools.  Dozens of kosher restaurants, kosher grocery stores, Jewish bookstores, Hasidic clothing stores, as well as other Orthodox Jewish businesses are found around the Jewish community. The area is one of few locations in the world for the Telshe Yeshiva Rabbinical College. Greater Cleveland is also home to a notable sect of Hasidism, the Aleksander Hasidic Dynasty.

Greater Cleveland has an Eruv that covers the majority of the Orthodox neighborhoods, including Cleveland Heights, Beachwood, Shaker Heights, University Heights, and South Euclid. Following a severe winter storm on March 8, 2018, a part of the eruv connected to a power line was downed, the first time in over 33 years for this to happen.

There are many Orthodox organizations in Greater Cleveland. Aish Hatorah of Cleveland is an adult Judaic studies organization. Bellefaire JCB is a Jewish family organization. There are several mikvahs in Greater Cleveland.

Notable people 
The following list includes notable people from, who live, or who have lived in Greater Cleveland and are Jewish. This list also includes people who are not from Greater Cleveland but have lived or live in Greater Cleveland, and have made a significant impact in the Cleveland community.

 Koby Altman, Cleveland Cavaliers General Manager
 Vanessa Bayer, Saturday Night Live cast member, comedian
 William Bayer, author
 Arthur T. Benjamin, Mathematician 
 David Mark Berger, Olympic weightlifter, killed by Palestinian terrorists at the 1972 Olympic Games in Munich, Germany
 David Blatt, Former coach of the Cleveland Cavaliers
 Sara J. Bloomfield, Director of United States Holocaust Museum
 Stuart Blumberg, Writer and Director
 Andy Borowitz, creator of the Fresh Prince of Bel-Air, author
 Armond Budish, Executive of Cuyahoga County, 100th Speaker of the Ohio House of Representatives.
 Judith Butler, philosopher and gender theorist.
 Gary Cohn, former director of the National Economic Council, former COO of Goldman Sachs
 Marc Cohn, Grammy Award winning singer-songwriter, known for his 1991 hit Walking in Memphis and other songs
 Rebecca Dallet, Supreme Court of Wisconsin Judge
 Grand Rebbe Shneur Zalman Dancyger, Grand Rebbe of the Aleksander Hasidic dynasty
 Marc Dann, former Attorney General of Ohio
 William Daroff, director of the Washington office of the Jewish Federations of North America
 Ted Deutch, US congressman from Florida since 2010, speaker at the 2016 Democratic National Convention
 Nachum Zev Dessler, rabbi, former head and dean of the Hebrew Academy of Cleveland
 Steven M. Dettelbach, lawyer, former United States Attorney for the Northern District of Ohio
 Mickey Edwards, former US Representative from Oklahoma
 Eric Ehrmann, writer
 Harry Eisenstat, former baseball player for Cleveland Indians
 Harlan Ellison, writer
 Eric Fingerhut, CEO of the Jewish Federations of North America, former president of Hillel International, Former US Congressman from Ohio and unsuccessful US Senate candidate
 Judah Folkman, scientist
 Lee Fisher, former Lieutenant Governor of Ohio under Ted Strickland and unsuccessful US Senate candidate
 Dorothy Fuldheim, news anchor
 Alan Freed, Disc Jockey, known for coining the term Rock and Roll
 Benny Friedman, football player and coach
 Rabbi Mordechai Gifter, Rosh Yeshiva of Telz
 Donald A. Glaser, physicist, winner of the 1960 Nobel Prize in Physics
 Samuel Glazer, founder of Mr. Coffee
 Tamir Goodman, basketball player in Israel for Maccabi Tel Aviv
 Adele Goldberg, Computer Scientist
 Brad Goldberg, Chicago White Sox pitcher
 Joel Grey, actor
 Jerry Heller, rap group manager
 Joel Hyatt, businessman, entrepreneur, and politician; founder of Hyatt Legal Clinics. Ran unsuccessfully for US Senate. Son-in-law of Howard Metzenbaum
 Eliezer Jaffe, Israel Free Loan Association Founder
 Carol Kane, actress
 Mickey Katz, musician and comedian
 Allison Krause, Kent State Shooting Victim, Vietnam War Protester
 RB Kitaj, artist
 Ron Klein, former US congressman from Florida
 Hal Lebovitz, sportswriter
 Arthur Lelyveld, rabbi and noted social activist
 Joseph Lelyveld, New York Times Executive Editor
 Al Lerner, businessman, former owner of the Cleveland Browns
 Ari Lesser, Orthodox Jewish rapper
 D.A. Levy, poet
 Peter B. Lewis, philanthropist, former CEO of Progressive Corporation
 Roy Lichtenstein, Cartoonist
 Terri Libenson, creator of the comic, The Pajama Diaries
 Todd Lieberman, film producer
 Josh Mandel, former State Treasurer of Ohio,  U.S. Senate candidate
 Morton Mandel, major philanthropist and businessman; his family is the namesake of several Jewish organizations and buildings around the community
 Howard Metzenbaum, Former US senator from Ohio in 1974 and 1976–1995
 Eric A. Meyer, web designer and author
 Aaron David Miller, Diplomat, CNN Analyst
 Sam Miller, noted businessman and philanthropist 
 Paul Newman, actor and director
 Susan Orlean, journalist
 Paul Palnik, artist, writer, and teacher
 Harvey Pekar, cartoonist
 Dan Polster, federal judge of the United States District Court for the Northern District of Ohio
 Sally Priesand, first female Rabbi in the United States ordained by a rabbinical seminary
 Bruce Ratner, real estate developer, former minority owner of Brooklyn Nets
 Carole Rendon, Former US  Attorney for the Northern District of Ohio
 Geraldo Rivera, TV Personality
 Al Rosen, four-time all-star baseball player for the Cleveland Indians
 Louis Rosenblum, philanthropist and activist
 Milton Shapp, Former Governor of Pennsylvania, Presidential Candidate in the 1976 Presidential Election
 Michael Sherwin, Former Acting United States Attorney for the District of Columbia
 Chaim Schochet, real estate executive and developer.
 Mitchell Schwartz, offensive lineman for the Kansas City Chiefs, formerly for the Cleveland Browns
 Rob Senderoff, basketball coach for Kent State
 Jerry Siegel, co-creator of Superman with Joe Shuster
 Rabbi Abba Hillel Silver, prominent rabbi who met with President Harry Truman in promoting the creation of the State of Israel
 Joe Shuster, co-creator of Superman with Jerry Siegel
 Ray Solomonoff, inventor of algorithmic probability
 Robert L. Stark, real estate developer and founder and CEO of Stark Enterprises
 Rabbi Pesach Stein, Rosh Yeshiva of Telz
 Michael Wager, lawyer, Congressional candidate
 Max Wiznitzer, noted doctor
 Bert Wolstein, philanthropist and businessman
 Milton A. Wolf, United States Ambassador to Austria
 Lew Wasserman, talent agent, won the Presidential Medal of Freedom in 1995
 Richard Zare, Professor

References

Jewish-American history by city